Chacalilla is a small beach area in the Mexican state of Nayarit on the Pacific coast of Mexico.  It is located north of Puerto Vallarta and near Chacala as part of the state's coastline known as the Riviera Nayarita.  It is a secluded beach with calm emerald-green waters. It is noted for scuba diving and kayaking.  In its breakwaters, remains of petroglyphs can be seen.

References

Beaches of Nayarit